The men's combined event at the 2018 World Singles Ninepin Bowling Classic Championships was held in Cluj-Napoca, Romania from 21 May to 26 May 2018.

Results 
The result for the combined was the sum of best results from a single starts in the single and sprint.

References 

2018
Men's combined